Oscar Gunnar Mascoll Silfverstolpe (21 January 1893 – 26 June 1942) was a Swedish poet, translator, and member of the Swedish Academy.

Biography

Silfverstolpe was born in Rytterne, Västmanland County. He was the son of army captain Carl Edvard Mascoll Silfverstolpe and Elsa Maria Gagge. Following his matriculation examination  (studentexamen) in 1911, he entered Uppsala University and studied art history. He graduated with a BA 1914 and a licentiate degree 1919. In 1918, he began working at the Royal Collections (Kungliga Husgerådskammaren). He rose to become the head of this department in 1936.

Silfverstolpe was secretary of the Bellman Society 1919-1934, and chairman from 1940. He was a board member of the Swedish PEN Club from 1922. He was elected to chair 18 of the Swedish Academy in 1941.

In 1940, Silfverstolpe underwent surgery to treat cancer.  His condition worsened in spring 1942 and he died on 26 June. Silfverstolpe died just half a year after joining the Swedish Academy, which makes his tenure the shortest of any member to date.

Bibliography

Poetry
 The Heritage (Arvet, 1919)
 Daylight (Dagsljus, 1923)
 Everyday (Vardag, 1926)
 Afterwards (Efteråt, 1932)
 Homeland (Hemland, 1940)

Art history
Prins Eugens konst (1935)
Det tessinska slottet (with R. Josephson and J. Böttiger, 1940)

Translations
 Vers från väster (with K. Asplund, poetry from late Victorian, Edwardian, and Georgian eras, 1922)
 Skattkammarön (Treasure Island by R.L. Stevenson, 1941)

References

External links
Silfverstolpe's biography in Svenskt Biografiskt Lexikon (in Swedish)
Silfverstolpe's biography in the member registry of the Swedish Academy

1893 births
1942 deaths
Members of the Swedish Academy
Uppsala University alumni
Swedish poets
Swedish translators
Deaths from cancer in Sweden